The Croatia national under-19 futsal team represents Croatia in futsal competitions for players aged 21 or under. Croatia is currently ranked 2nd by UEFA coefficient.

Results

UEFA Under 19 Futsal Championship

Players

Current squad 
Squad for 2019 Euro Under-19

References

External links 

 CROfutsal 
 HRfutsal.com 
 HNS-CFF 

 
national